Walter De Buck (13 July 1934  – 21 December 2014) was a Belgian singer, sculptor and the founder of the modern  (Ghent Festival). 

De Buck was born in Ghent in 1934. He studied at the Royal Academy of Fine Arts in Ghent, where he graduated in 1954 magna cum laude. De Buck made his debut as a sculptor at the 1958 World’s Fair and was awarded several prizes for his sculptures.

As a musician, De Buck made a name as a singer and writer of folk music with the song , released in 1971. In 1986 De Buck retired from Trefpunt to focus on his sculpture work. De Buck felt he would only stop being creative when he died. 

De Buck died on 21 December 2014 in Ghent from the effects of esophageal cancer, having previously been diagnosed with Alzheimer's disease.

This was the location where the  had been restarted in 1969.

References

1934 births
2014 deaths
20th-century Belgian male singers
20th-century Belgian singers
Musicians from Ghent
Belgian folk singers
20th-century Belgian sculptors
21st-century sculptors
Deaths from esophageal cancer
Deaths from cancer in Belgium
Artists from Ghent